Pseudorhaphitoma hexagonalis is a small sea snail, a marine gastropod mollusk in the family Mangeliidae.

Description
The length of the shell varies between 8 mm and 11 mm.

The yellowish white shell shows six distant longitudinal continuous ribs, and rather close revolving striae

Distribution
This marine species occurs the island of Bohol, the Philippines, and the Kai Islands, Indonesia<.

References

 R.N. Kilburn, Turridae (Mollusca: Gastropoda) of southern Africa and Mozambique. Part 7. Subfamily Mangeliinae, section 2; Annals of the Natal Museum 34, pp 317 - 367 (1993)

External links
 Schepman, 1913. The prosobranchia of the Siboga expedition. Part IV -V - VI: Toxoglossa 
 
 

hexagonalis
Gastropods described in 1845